Furong Mountain is located in the town of Qingshanqiao in the southwest of Ningxiang, Hunan, China, with a height of  above sea level.

Furong Mountain is noted for Puji Temple, a Buddhist temple located on the top of the mountain, which was built in the Yuan dynasty, and the temple's original name was Furong'an. It is the subject of a poem by Tang poet, Liu Changqing.

See also
List of mountains in Ningxiang

References

External links

Geography of Ningxiang
Tourist attractions in Changsha
Mountains of Hunan